Robert James (Bob) Stern (born February 2, 1951) is an American geoscientist based in Texas.

Stern is Professor of Geosciences and Director of the Global and Magmatic Research Laboratory at the University of Texas at Dallas University of Texas at Dallas. He has more than 40 years of geoscientific research experience, studying active convergent margin processes and products in the Mariana arc system Izu–Bonin–Mariana Arc in the Western Pacific as well as ancient (900-550 million year old) crust exposed in the Arabian-Nubian Shield of Egypt, Sudan, Ethiopia, Saudi Arabia, Jordan and Israel. Stern is expert on the Geology of the Dallas–Fort Worth Metroplex and the geology of Iran, and has made important contributions to the geology of the Caribbean and the Gulf of Mexico. These studies involve research at sea and on land. Geodynamic contributions include ideas about how new subduction zones form and the evolution of plate tectonics. He and his students and co-authors have published more than 200 peer-reviewed scientific papers.

Stern is also interested in generating educational animations and videos of geoscientific processes. He is head of UTD Geoscience Studios. He shares supervision of the UTD Geosciences Micro-imaging lab with Dr. Ignacio Pujana.  He is also co-director of the Permian Basin Research Laboratory. Stern is a Fellow of the Geological Society of America, the American Geophysical Union, and the American Association for the Advancement of Science and is Editor-in-Chief of International Geology Review. In 2015 he was inducted into the Oroville, California Union High School Hall of Fame  2019 he was awarded the International Prize of the Geological Society of Japan.  In 2022 he was selected as the UTD Polykarp Kusch Lecturer.

Education
Stern went to UC Davis, majoring first in Political Science before dropping out for a year and returning to major in Geology, graduating with honors in 1974. Stern undertook graduate studies at the Scripps Institution of Oceanography, undertaking the first of his many marine geoscientific research cruises, beginning with the EURYDICE cruise in 1975 aboard the R/V Thomas Washington, from Majuro back to San Diego.

In 1976 he made the first of many field trips to study the volcanic rocks of the Mariana island arc. In 1977 Stern began his PhD studies in the Precambrian rocks of the Eastern Desert of Egypt under the supervision of Prof. A.E.J.Engel http://www.nasonline.org/member-directory/deceased-members/56001.html.

Stern defended his PhD dissertation "Late Precambrian Ensimatic Volcanism in the Central Eastern Desert of Egypt" in Sept. 1979. From Sept. 1979 to January 1982, Stern was a post-doctoral fellow at the Department of Terrestrial Magnetism, Carnegie Institution of Washington https://carnegiescience.edu, carrying out isotopic studies of Egyptian and Mariana igneous rocks.

Academic life
In January 1982, Stern joined the faculty of Programs in Geosciences at the University of Texas at Dallas, rising from assistant professor to professor.

Stern teaches a required undergraduate course in igneous and metamorphic petrology and a required graduate course in tectonics, along with various elective undergraduate and graduate courses.  Stern's research concerns include the disciplines of tectonics, igneous geochemistry, isotope geochemistry, and geochronology.  Research areas include the Izu-Bonin-Mariana arc system in the Western Pacific, NE Africa and Arabia, Iran, the Gulf of Mexico, and the Permian Basin of Texas and New Mexico.  He has carried out field studies in Egypt, Sudan, Ethiopia, Saudi Arabia, Israel, and Jordan.  Stern has led or participated in many marine geoscientific expeditions in the Mariana convergent margin, exploring most of the submarine arc volcanoes by dredging and ROV studies; deeper regions in the backarc basin and forearc have been studied by dredging and diving with manned submersible.  Topics include studies of subduction, ophiolites, convergent margin tectonics and magmatism, subduction initiation and the evolution of plate tectonics on Earth.  Stern served as Geosciences Dept. Head from 1997 through 2005.

References

Plate Tectonic Basics 2: 
Acceptance Speech for 2019 Japan Geological Society International Prize:
Stern, R. J.  1994. Neoproterozoic (900-550 Ma) Arc Assembly and continental collision in the East African Orogen. Annual Review of Earth and Planetary Sciences, 22, 319–351, 1994.
Stern, R.J., Fouch, M.J., and Klemperer, S., 2003. An Overview of the Izu–Bonin–Mariana Subduction Factory in J. Eiler and M. Hirschmann (eds.) Inside the Subduction Factory, Geophysical Monograph 138, American Geophysical Union, 175–222.
Stern, R.J., and Dickinson, W.R., 2010.  The Gulf of Mexico is a Jurassic back-arc Basin. Geosphere v. 6; no. 6; pp. 739–754; doi: 10.1130/GES00585.1
Stern, R.J., and Pujana, I., 2015. Stratigraphy of the Dallas-Fort Worth Metroplex in G. Maxey and R. Farrish (eds.) Guide to Fossil Collecting, Dallas Paleontological Society, p.
Stern, R.J., Li, S., and Keller, G.R., 2018. Continental Crust of China: A Brief Guide for the Perplexed. Earth-Science Reviewss 179, 72–94
Stern, R.J., and Gerya, T., 2018.  Subduction Initiation in nature and models: A review. Tectonophysics 746, 173–198.
Stern, R.J., 2018.  The Evolution of Plate Tectonics. Philosophical Transactions A, 376, 20170406 DOI 10.1098/rsta.2017.0406
2022 Polykarp Kusch Lecture: UTD Geologic Studies of the Mariana Trench and the Challenge Deep

1951 births
Living people
20th-century American geologists
21st-century American geologists